Michael J. Bedzyk is an x-ray physicist, Professor of Materials Science and Engineering at Northwestern University.

Biography
His research program includes the development of novel X-ray probes and the characterization of surface, interface, and thin-film structures with atomic resolution. He conducts experiments using both in-house and synchrotron X-ray facilities. The latter have greatly enhanced chemical and structural sensitivity for studying systems as dilute as one-hundredth of an atomic monolayer.

He also developed a number of methods for generating X-ray standing waves with differing characteristic length scales. He uses these periodic X-ray probes to pinpoint the lattice location of adsorbate atoms on crystalline surfaces, to measure strain within epitaxially grown semiconductor and ferroelectric thin films, and to locate heavy atoms within ordered ultrathin organic films.

Awards and significant honors
Fellow, American Association for the Advancement of Science, 2012

Fellow, American Physical Society, 1998

Bertram Eugene Warren Diffraction Physics Award, American Crystallographic Association, 1994

Education
Bedzyk received his bachelor's, M.S., and PhD degrees all from State University of New York at Albany. His PhD thesis was titled "X-ray standing wave analysis for bromine chemisorbed on silicon."

References

 Michael Bedzyk's Faculty Page
Bedzyk Research Group

Northwestern University faculty
21st-century American physicists
Fellows of the American Association for the Advancement of Science
Living people
University at Albany, SUNY alumni
Year of birth missing (living people)